The 1962 Duke Blue Devils football team represented Duke University during the 1962 NCAA University Division football season.

Duke won their third consecutive ACC Championship with a record of 6–0 in conference play. They were ranked eighth in the polls for their season opener against USC, but dropped out of the rankings following their loss and were not ranked again for the remainder of the season.

The Blue Devils declined an invitation to play in the 1962 Gator Bowl.

Schedule

References

Duke
Duke Blue Devils football seasons
Atlantic Coast Conference football champion seasons
Duke Blue Devils football